Scopula tanalorum is a moth of the  family Geometridae. It is found on Madagascar.

References

Moths described in 1972
tanalorum
Moths of Madagascar